The FE2 Hydroelectric Power Station is a 36 megawatts hydroelectric power station in Gabon. Construction of this dam began in 2010. Due to lack of adequate funding, work was abandoned in 2013. In 2018, after a five-year hiatus, Tebian Electric Apparatus Stock Limited (TBEA), a Chinese independent power producer (IPP), in collaboration with the Gabonese Strategic Investment Fund, indicated their intention to invest €180 million into the development of FE2 HPP. The engineering, procurement and construction (EPC) contract was awarded to the China Gezhouba Group Company (CGGC). The energy off-taker is Société d'Énergie et d'Eau du Gabon (SEEG), the national electricity utility company of Gabon.

Location
The power station is located across the FE2 waterfall, on the Okano River, southeast of the town of Mitzic, in Okano Department, in Woleu-Ntem Province, in northern Gabon.

Overview
Three vertical Francis type turbines, each rated at 12 MW, will provide capacity of 36 megawatts. Other related infrastructure developments include a new substation, an evacuation transmission line, a workers' camp and access roads to the site.

It is expected that the off-taker of the energy generated here will be the national electricity utility parastatal company, SEEG. The power is intended for distribution to the city of Libreville, the national capital, to Ndjolé, in the Abanga-Bigne Department of Moyen-Ogooué Province and to the province of Woleu-Ntem.

Recent developments
As of December 2020, the Government of Gabon was still seeking funding to complete the construction of FE2 Hydroelectric Power Station, whose annual energy output is calculated at 240 GWh annually.

 Aristide Ngari is the Director General, Ministry of Energy, Government of Gabon.

See also

List of power stations in Gabon
Kinguélé Aval Hydroelectric Power Station

References

External links
 Gabon: FE2 hydro scheme resumes construction As of 13 May 2016].

Power stations in Gabon
Woleu-Ntem Province
Hydroelectric power stations in Gabon